The Cathedral of St. Lawrence or Cathedral of Saint Laurence or variation, may refer to:

Croatia 
Trogir Cathedral

Czech Republic 
Cathedral of St Lawrence, Prague

India 
Cathedral of St Lawrence, Belthangady

Italy 
Genoa Cathedral

Paraguay 
St. Lawrence Cathedral, San Lorenzo

Sweden 
Lund Cathedral
Uppsala Cathedral

Switzerland 
Lugano Cathedral

United States 
St. Laurence Catholic Church (Amarillo, Texas), United States, formerly St Laurence Cathedral

See also
 St. Laurence's Church (disambiguation)
 Basilica of St. Lawrence (disambiguation)
 Saint Lawrence (disambiguation)